Abdoulaye Soumaré (born 7 November 1980 in Saint-Ouen, France) is a French-Burundian striker currently playing for  UR Namur.

Personal
Abdoulaye is the elder brother of Adama Soumaré and Elhadji Yaya Soumaré, who plays in the CFA from Le Havre AC.

External links
Player Profile
Footgoal Profile

1980 births
Living people
French footballers
French people of Burundian descent
Le Havre AC players
Expatriate footballers in Belgium
Royal Excel Mouscron players
K.S.V. Roeselare players
R.E. Virton players
K.R.C. Mechelen players
Association football forwards